is a Japanese former footballer and manager.

Club career
Yasunaga was born in Ube on April 20, 1976. After graduating from Shimizu Commercial High School, he joined Yokohama Marinos (later Yokohama F. Marinos) in 1995. In 1995 season, he played many matches and won the champions J1 League. In 1997, he moved to Segunda División club Lleida. He returned to Yokohama Marinos in 1998 and he moved to Shimizu S-Pulse in 1999. He played as regular player and won the 2nd place 1999 J1 League. In Asia, the club won the champions 1999–2000 Asian Cup Winners' Cup. He returned to Yokohama F. Marinos in September 2001. However he could hardly play in the match and he moved to Segunda División club Racing Ferrol in 2002. he returned to Yokohama F. Marinos in 2003. He moved to Kashiwa Reysol in 2005 and retired end of 2005 season.

National team career
In April 1995, Yasunaga was selected Japan U-20 national team for 1995 World Youth Championship. He played full-time in all 4 matches and scored a goal against Burundi.

Coaching career
In August 2016, Yasunaga became a manager for SC Sagamihara as Norihiro Satsukawa successor. He resigned end of 2017 season.

Club statistics

Managerial statistics

References

External links
 
 
 

1976 births
Living people
Association football people from Yamaguchi Prefecture
Japanese footballers
Japan youth international footballers
J1 League players
Segunda División players
Yokohama F. Marinos players
UE Lleida players
Shimizu S-Pulse players
Racing de Ferrol footballers
Kashiwa Reysol players
Japanese expatriate footballers
Expatriate footballers in Spain
Japanese football managers
J3 League managers
SC Sagamihara managers
Association football forwards